Sailing at the 2015 Southeast Asian Games took place at the National Sailing Centre in East Coast Park, Singapore and Marina Bay, Singapore between 6–14 June.

Competition schedule

Results

Medal summary

Men

Women

Mixed

References